Alwalton is a village and civil parish in Cambridgeshire, England. Alwalton is situated within Huntingdonshire which is a non-metropolitan district of Cambridgeshire as well as being a historic county of England. The village runs onto the Peterborough suburb of Orton Northgate, with which the administrative boundary runs along the A605 road, the northern side of the road being in Alwalton and the southern side in Orton Northgate. Alwalton overlooks the southern bank of the River Nene and is close to the line of Ermine Street or the A1 road, west of which lies the neighbouring village of Chesterton.

Domesday Book
Alwalton was listed in the Domesday Book in the hundred of Norman Cross in Huntingdonshire; the name of the settlement was written as Alwoltune. In 1086 there was just one manor at Alwalton; the annual rent paid to the lord of the manor in 1066 had been £7 and the rent was the same in 1086.

The Domesday Book does not explicitly detail the population of a place but it records that there was 20 households at Alwalton. There is no consensus about the average size of a household at that time; estimates range from 3.5 to 5.0 people per household. Using these figures then an estimate of the population of Alwalton in 1086 is that it was within the range of 70 and 100 people.
The survey records that there was nine ploughlands at Alwalton in 1086. For the manor at Alwalton the total tax assessed was five geld.

There was no mention of a church at Alwalton.

Government
As a civil parish, Alwalton has a parish council elected by the residents of the parish who have registered on the electoral roll. A parish council is the lowest tier of government in England, responsible for providing and maintaining a variety of local services including allotments and a cemetery; grass cutting and tree planting within public open spaces such as a village green or playing fields. The parish council reviews planning applications that might affect the parish and makes recommendations to  the local planning authority. The parish council also represents the views of the parish on issues such as local transport, policing and the environment. The parish council raises the parish precept to pay for services, which is collected as part of the Council Tax.  Alwalton parish council consists of five members and normally meets on the third Thursday of every month in the village hall.

Alwalton was in the historic and administrative county of Huntingdonshire until 1965. From 1965, the village was part of the new administrative county of Huntingdon and Peterborough. Then in 1974, following the Local Government Act 1972, Alwalton became a part of the county of Cambridgeshire.

The second tier of local government is Huntingdonshire District Council which is a non-metropolitan district of Cambridgeshire and has its headquarters in Huntingdon. Huntingdonshire District Council has 52 councillors representing 29 district wards. Huntingdonshire District Council collects the council tax, and provides services such as building regulations, local planning, environmental health, leisure and tourism. Alwalton is part of the district ward of Elton and Folksworth, represented by one councillor. District councillors serve for four-year terms following elections to Huntingdonshire District Council.

For Alwalton, the highest tier of local government is Cambridgeshire County Council which has administration buildings in Cambridge. The county council provides county-wide services such as major road infrastructure, fire and rescue, education, social services, libraries and heritage services. Cambridgeshire County Council consists of 69 councillors representing 60 electoral divisions. Alwalton is a part of the electoral division of Sawtry & Stilton, represented on the county council by one councillor. County councillors serve for four-year terms following elections to Cambridgeshire County Council.

At Westminster, Alwalton is in the parliamentary constituency of North West Cambridgeshire, and elects one Member of Parliament (MP) by the first past the post system of election. The Conservative Shailesh Vara has represented the constituency since 2005. Brian Mawhinney (Conservative) represented the area between 1997 and 2005.

Demography

Population
In the period 1801 to 1901 the population of Alwalton was recorded every ten years by the UK census.  During this time the population was in the range of 216 (the lowest in 1811) and 342 (the highest in 1861).

From 1901, a census was taken every ten years with the exception of 1941 (due to the Second World War).

All population census figures from report Historic Census figures Cambridgeshire to 2011 by Cambridgeshire Insight.

Landmarks
Alwalton is a conservation area with a number of listed buildings, the most important of which are the Norman Church of St Andrew's and the Elizabethan Manor House. Alwalton Hall was built for the 4th Earl Fitzwilliam.

The East of England Showground lies to the south of the village.  The  site is used for shows and commercial exhibitions. Until 2012 it was the home each June for the East of England Show.

Notable people
Sir Henry Royce (27 March 1863 to 22 April 1933), the co founder of Rolls-Royce, was born in the village and his ashes were buried in St Andrew's Church where a plaque has been placed on the wall as well on a spot on the floor, beneath which his ashes were buried in an urn.  His remains were originally buried in 1933 beneath a statue of him at the Rolls-Royce works in Derby but in 1937 his urn was removed and brought to Alwalton.

Frank Perkins (20 February 1889 – 15 October 1967), founder of Perkins Engines, died at his home, Alwalton Hall, and is buried at St Andrew's Church.

From 1927 to 1937 Frank Buttle was rector of Chesterton with Haddon and Alwalton.

References

External links
 
 

Villages in Cambridgeshire
Huntingdonshire
Civil parishes in Cambridgeshire